
Year 491 (CDXCI) was a common year starting on Tuesday (link will display the full calendar) of the Julian calendar. At the time, it was known as the Year of the Consulship of Olybrius without colleague (or, less frequently, year 1244 Ab urbe condita). The denomination 491 for this year has been used since the early medieval period, when the Anno Domini calendar era became the prevalent method in Europe for naming years.

Events 
<onlyinclude>

By place

Byzantine Empire 
 April 9 – Emperor Zeno, age 66, dies of dysentery (or of epilepsy) after a 17-year reign. He has no sons to succeed him and Anastasius, palace official (silentiarius) and  favoured friend of empress Ariadne, is elevated to the throne. 
 May 20 – Anastasius I marries Ariadne shortly after his accession. His reign is disturbed by religious distractions and a civil war started by Longinus, brother of late emperor Zeno.    
 Anti-Isaurian riots break out in the Hippodrome at Constantinople. Longinus and several other Isaurians, including general Longinus of Cardala, are exiled to Thebaid (Egypt).

Britannia 
 Aelle of Sussex besieges and conquers the fortified town Anderitum in southern Britain. He massacres the population, apparently sub-Roman Brythons (according to the Anglo-Saxon Chronicle).

Europe 
 July 9 – Odoacer makes a night assault with his Heruli guardsmen, engaging Theodoric the Great in Ad Pinetam. Both sides suffer heavy losses, but in the end Theodoric repulses the attack, forcing Odoacer back into Ravenna.

Asia 
 Munjamyeong becomes ruler of the Korean kingdom of Goguryeo.

By topic

Religion 
 Lupicinus becomes bishop of Lyon. He is the founder of the abbeys of Saint Claude (Jura Mountains).

Births 
 Approximate date - John Malalas, Byzantine chronicler (d. c. 578)

Deaths 
 April 9 – Zeno, Byzantine Emperor
 Peter the Iberian, Georgian theologian and saint

References